NW1 may refer to:

NW postcode area
National Waterway 1 (India)